This is a list of years in the Netherlands.

16th century

17th century

18th century

19th century

20th century

21st century

Further reading
  + "Holland"
 
 
 
  + "Holland"

External links
 
 

Years in the Netherlands
Netherlands history-related lists
Netherlands